Beetle Bailey is an American comic strip created by cartoonist Mort Walker, published since September 4, 1950. It is set on a fictional United States Army post. In the years just before Walker's death in 2018 (at age 94), it was among the oldest comic strips still being produced by its original creator. Over the years, Mort Walker had been assisted by (among others) Jerry Dumas, Bob Gustafson, Frank Johnson and Walker's sons, Neal, Brian and Greg Walker, who are continuing the strip after his death.

Overview
Beetle was originally a college student at Rockview University. The characters in that early strip were modeled after Walker's Kappa Sigma fraternity brothers at the University of Missouri. On March 13, 1951, during the strip's first year, Beetle quit school and enlisted in the U.S. Army, where he has remained ever since.

Most of the humor in Beetle Bailey revolves around the inept characters stationed at Camp Swampy (inspired by Camp Crowder, where Walker had once been stationed while in the Army), which is located near the town of Hurleyburg at "Parris Island, S.C." (a real-life Marine Corps base). Private Bailey is a lazy sort who usually naps and avoids work, and thus is often the subject of verbal and physical chastising from his senior NCO, Sergeant Snorkel. The characters never seem to see combat themselves, with the exception of mock battles and combat drills. In fact, they seem to be in their own version of stereotypical comic strip purgatory (initially basic training, they now appear to be stuck in time in a regular infantry division).

The uniforms of Beetle Bailey are still the uniforms of the late 1940s to early 1970s Army, with green fatigues and patrol caps as the basic uniform, and the open jeep as the basic military vehicle. Sergeant First Class Snorkel wears a green dress uniform with a heavily wrinkled garrison cap; the officers wear M1 helmet liners painted with their insignia. Despite this anachronism, modern weapons and equipment do make rare appearances. While Beetle Bailey's unit is Company A, one running gag is that the characters are variously seen performing activities associated with different types of units in the Army, such as artillery, armor, infantry and paratroops. Occasionally dream sequences have appeared where the characters see themselves as seasoned combat veterans, such as Sarge having a dream he was General "Storming Snorkel" briefing on Operation Desert Shield, or Beetle imagining himself getting out of the Army and going back to school on the G.I. Bill, where cute coeds all know him as "Bombshell Bailey, the famous war hero". 

Beetle is always seen with a hat or helmet which covers his forehead and eyes. Even on leave, his "civvies" include a pork pie hat worn in the same style. He can only be seen without it once—in the original strip, when he was still a college student. The strip was pulled and never ran in any newspaper. It has only been printed in various books on the strip's history. One daily strip had Sarge scare Beetle's hat off, but Beetle was wearing sunglasses.

One running gag has Sergeant Snorkel hanging helplessly from a small tree branch after having fallen off a cliff (first time August 16, 1956). While he is never shown falling off, or even walking close to the edge of a cliff, he always seems to hold on to that same branch, yelling for help.

Publication history
During the first two years of Beetle Baileys run (1950-1952), Walker did all work on the strip himself, including writing, penciling, inking and lettering; however, in 1952 he hired cartoonist Fred Rhoads as his first assistant. After that, numerous people would assist Walker on the strip through the years.

As of 2016, the strip was being syndicated (by King Features) in 1,800 papers in the United States and the rest of the world.

In Sweden, the strip received a dedicated magazine in 1970, with a Norwegian version being added the following year, which is published to this day as of 2020. Denmark also has dedicated (albeit not exclusive) magazine, named "Basserne", first published in 1973.

Characters and story

Main characters
Private Carl James "Beetle" Bailey—the main character and the strip's namesake, a feckless, shirking, perpetual goof-off and straggler known for his chronic laziness and generally insubordinate attitude. Slack, hapless, lanky and freckled, Beetle's eyes are always concealed, whether by headgear or, in the rare instance of not wearing any (e.g., in the shower), by his hair. He is an expert in camouflage as he is often hiding from Sarge. In early strips, it was revealed that he is the brother of Lois Flagston (née Bailey) of the Hi and Lois comic strip, which Mort Walker wrote, and Dik Browne drew. Beetle is a member of "Kilo Company" 3rd Battalion of the 9th Infantry Regiment, in the fictional 13th Division. Beetle's and Lois's grandmother came from Dublin, Ireland. He has an enforced chef's palate from being forced to taste Cookie's questionable preparations.
Sergeant 1st Class Orville P. Snorkel—Beetle's platoon sergeant and nemesis, introduced in 1951. Sarge is known to frequently beat up Beetle for any excuse he can think of, leaving Beetle a shapeless pulp. Once, in the February 2, 1971 strip, he even shoved Beetle through a knothole in the floorboard. Sarge is too lovable to be a villain, however. Obese, snaggle-toothed and volatile, Sarge can be alternately short-tempered and sentimental. He and Beetle seem to have a mutual love/hate relationship; much of the time there is an implied truce between them. They share an uneasy alliance that sometimes borders on genuine (albeit unequal) friendship. Sarge is also a helpless foodie, loves food like crazy and does not miss even a single chance where he can lay his hands on food. He is seen gobbling up cookies and cakes that Beetle's mother lovingly sends him. In some early strips Sarge was married, but he was later retconned into an unmarried Army lifer, who knows next to nothing about civilian life. Despite his grouchiness and bossiness, Sarge does have a soft side, which he usually keeps concealed. He is from Pork Corners, Kansas. He was also known to be very foul-mouthed, even compared to the rest of the cast. Sarge's mother's maiden name is "Papadopoulos", suggesting that he is of Greek heritage.
Otto—Sgt. Snorkel's anthropomorphic, look-alike bulldog whom Sarge dresses up the same as himself, in an army uniform. Otto is fiercely protective of Sarge and seems to have a particular antipathy towards Beetle. His first appearance was July 17, 1956; originally he was a regular dog who walked on all fours, but Mort Walker finally decided to make him more human-like. As Walker put it, "I guess he's funnier that way." Otto got his army uniform in the June 6, 1958 strip.
Brigadier General Amos T. Halftrack—the inept, frustrated, semi-alcoholic commander of Camp Swampy, introduced in 1951. He loves to golf, much to his wife Martha's dismay. He sometimes harasses his secretary, Miss Buxley. He is 78 years old, from Kenner, Louisiana—though according to Capt. Scabbard he was born in China (April 28, 1971).
Miss Buxley—Halftrack's beautiful, blonde, buxom civilian secretary—and occasional soldier's date (as well as a constant distraction for Halftrack). She used to live in Amarillo, Texas. Miss Buxley has an apparent interest in Beetle and later becomes his girlfriend, but is constantly pursued by Killer.
Lieutenant Sonny Fuzz—very young (with noticeably pointy eyebrows and very little facial hair), overly earnest, anal-retentive and "by the book" and highly susceptible to squeaky furniture. The apple-polishing Fuzz is always trying to impress uninterested superiors (especially Halftrack), and "rub it in the noses" of his subordinates. He was introduced March 7, 1956. Mort Walker said he modeled the character and personality of Lt. Fuzz on himself, having taken himself too seriously after completing Officer Training. Lt. Fuzz has also managed to get on Sarge's bad side, albeit not as much as the enlisted men. A strip had Lt. Fuzz discussing with Sarge about the fact that Beetle Bailey has been a private for a long time and recommends he be sent before a promotion board. Sarge flashes back to all of Beetle's errors, then yells in fury at Lt. Fuzz, who has no idea what he did to infuriate Sgt. Snorkel.
Lieutenant Jackson Flap—the strip's first Black character, often touchy and suspicious but effortlessly cool, introduced in 1970. Originally wore an afro hairstyle, but later shaved it off as later regulations disallowed many hairdos. Has often been seen with a beard, and is in most ways the total opposite to Lt. Fuzz, even though they share the same rank. Walker created Flap due to critique of the all-White crew of the comic strip, and was immediately censored by US Army newspaper Stars and Stripes until criticism made the publication revert the decision and publish strips with Flap in them along the rest.
Cookie (Cornelius) Jowls—the mess sergeant, who smokes cigarettes while preparing the mess hall's questionable menu (infamous for rubbery meatballs and tough-as-rawhide steaks). He practices no sanitary food preparation measures aside from wearing a chef hat, and is almost always seen wearing a tank top. Walker once described him as "the sum of all Army cooks I've met in my life." He bears a striking resemblance to SFC Snorkel and has also been known to occasionally beat up on Beetle. Like Sarge, he also loves food, though he is not above using Beetle as a guinea pig (which Beetle loathes). Although similar to Sarge, Cookie has had the most tension with Snorkel, particularly when Sarge raided the mess hall after Cookie stopped working and the kitchen was off-limits. In the strip of February 8, 2022, he reveals his real first name to be Cornelius. He also revealed that his sense of taste was nonexistent.
Private "Killer" Diller—the notorious ladies' man and Beetle's frequent crony—introduced in 1951.
Private Zero—the buck-toothed, naïve farm boy who takes commands literally and misunderstands practically everything. Sometimes Zero, although not lazy (and therefore never assaulted as Beetle often is), infuriates Sarge more than anyone else. Was briefly promoted from Private to Lieutenant during a military exercise (September 29, 2013). Following the exercise, he was returned to his normal rank of E-1 Private (shown in his next strip appearance on Saturday, October 12, 2013). He was raised in Cornpone, Nebraska.
Private Plato—the Camp's resident intellectual; bespectacled, given to scrawling long-winded, analytical, often philosophical graffiti. Named after Plato but based on Walker's pal, fellow cartoonist Dik Browne. Plato is the only character other than Beetle to evolve from the early "college" months of the strip. Asked his full name, he tells Beetle "Aristotle Anaximenes Heraclitus Papagelis".

Supporting characters
Private Blips—Gen. Halftrack's competent, jaded, not-at-all-buxom secretary ("blips" are small points of light on a radar screen). She resents Halftrack's constant ogling of Miss Buxley, and though envious of the latter's beauty maintains a polite working relationship with her.
Chaplain Stainglass—"He's praying... he's looking at the food... he's praying again!" According to Mort Walker's Private Scrapbook, Walker based the chaplain on Irish actor Barry Fitzgerald's priest character from Going My Way (1944). He often tries to get Sarge to not beat up Beetle or the men but his efforts are either futile or backfire.
Martha [Knips] Halftrack—the General's formidable, domineering wife. She is 70 years old and is from Morganfield, Kentucky. Her brother Sgt Knips is the senior NCO at Camp Swampy 
Private Rocky—Camp Swampy's long-haired, disgruntled social dissident, a former biker gang member and rebel-without-a-clue, introduced in 1958. Is the editor of the "Camp Swampy Muckateer".
Private Cosmo—Camp Swampy's sunglass-wearing, resident "shady entrepreneur" and huckster. Loosely based on William Holden's Sefton character from Stalag 17; almost forgotten in the 1980s.
Captain Sam Scabbard—hard-nosed, flat-top wearing officer, commander of A Company and usually depicted as competent. Can be firm with Sarge, but also trusts him. Mort Walker has said that there needed to be at least one normal person in the comic.
Major Greenbrass—staff officer, golf partner, and brother-in-law of Gen. Halftrack. He is most often simply a sounding-board for the general, reacting to his superior's shenanigans instead of causing his own.
Private Julius Plewer—fastidious fussbudget, who eventually became Halftrack's chauffeur.
Corporal Yo—the strip's first and only Asian character, introduced in 1990, who tries to help Sarge bring efficiency to Company A. Like Major Greenbrass' relationship to General Halftrack, Cpl. Yo is most often a conversation partner for Sarge or one of the lieutenants. He is rarely presented as a goof like the other enlisted men frequently are. After 30 years in the strip he was redesigned with an olive complexion and less slanted eyes. 
Dr. Bonkus—Camp Swampy's loopy staff psychiatrist, whose own sanity is questionable.
Sergeant 1st Class Louise Lugg—a tough soldier who hopes to be Sarge's girlfriend, introduced in 1986. Lt. Flap wondered why Lugg was sent to the camp; Halftrack commented that she showed up after he called the Pentagon to request an overseas assignment—"I asked them to send me abroad." Although more competent than the male enlisted personnel, she has shown moments of stupidity herself. When attempting to try to get Sarge's attention, Beetle advised Sgt. Lugg "to soften him up, then whammo, nail him!" Sarge is then seen getting gifts of beer and comic books "from Louise Lugg", then says to himself he had her figured out all wrong and how sensitive she was. As Sarge is walking, Lugg is seen around a corner with a baseball bat and chains, having taken Beetle's advice too literally.
Bella—Sgt. Louise Lugg's female cat.
Specialist Chip Gizmo— Camp Swampy's resident computer geek, was named by a write-in contest in 2002. The contest, sponsored by Dell Computer Corp., received more than 84,000 entries. It raised more than $100,000 for the Fisher House Foundation, a non-profit organization that provides housing for families of patients at military and veterans hospitals. Due to his expertise in information technology, he was often seen working near General Halftrack's office aiding him and Miss Buxley.

Retired characters
Bunny Piper—Was Beetle's seldom-seen girlfriend (from 1959), before he started dating Miss Buxley.
Buzz—Was Beetle's girlfriend before 1959.
 Canteen (early 1950s)—always eating.
 Snake Eyes (early 1950s)—the barracks gambler, replaced by Cosmo, Rocky and others.
 Big Blush (early 1950s)—tall, innocent, and a great attraction to the girls; many of his characteristics incorporated into both Sarge and Zero.
 Fireball (early 1950s)—neophyte who always seems to be in the way, forerunner of both Zero and Lt. Fuzz.
 Bammy (early 1950s)—the southern patriot from Alabama who is still fighting the Civil War.
 Dawg (early 1950s)—the guy in every barracks who creates his own pollution.
 Ozone (late 1950s)—Zero's bigger, even more naïve friend.
 Moocher (early 1960s)—stingy and always borrowing things.
 Pop (1960s)—married private: gets yelled at by Sarge all day and goes home at night for more abuse from his wife.
 Sergeant Webbing—variously described as being from either B Company or D Company. He somewhat resembles Snorkel, except that he lacks the trademark wrinkles in Snorkel's garrison cap and has wavy hair and thick eyebrows. He has pointy teeth. On at least two separate occasions, Webbing engaged Sgt. Snorkel in a cussing duel. He also attempted to one-up Snorkel in anthropomorphizing dogs, leading to Otto's first appearance in uniform, and was most recently seen (recognizably, but not mentioned by name) in 1983.
 Rolf (early 1980s)—civilian tennis instructor, very popular with the female cast (including both Mrs. Halftrack and Miss Buxley, much to General Halftrack's consternation). Originally introduced in response to complaints about the constant ogling of Miss Buxley by the male characters. First appearance was in the September 9, 1982 strip, disappeared completely by the mid-1980s.

The early strip was set at Rockview University. When Beetle joined the Army, all of the other characters were dropped (although both incarnations of the strip include a spectacled intellectual named Plato). Four characters from the original cast (Bitter Bill, Diamond Jim, Freshman, and Sweatsock) made at least one appearance, in the January 5, 1963 strip.

Extras, one-shots and walk-ons
Beetle's family, etc.:

 Mr. and Mrs. Bailey, parents of Beetle, Lois, and Chigger. (The 2/7/52 strip names Beetle's father as Gurney.)
 Lois Flagston (née Bailey), Beetle's sister; she and her husband are the title characters of the Hi and Lois comic strips. Beetle was shown in a crossover where he is first telling Zero and Plato he has taken leave to visit his sister and brother-in-law. He then appears the next day in Hi & Lois, wearing civilian clothes.
 Chigger, the younger brother of Beetle and Lois
 Hiram "Hi" Flagston, Beetle's brother-in-law and Lois's husband
 Chip, Dot, Ditto, and Trixie Flagston, Hi and Lois's children, Beetle's nephews and nieces
 Mr. and Mrs. Piper, Bunny's parents
Camp Swampy:
 A camp doctor whose appearance is consistent, but who is apparently unnamed 
 An unnamed officers' club bartender, frequent intermediary between the Halftracks
 An unnamed Secretary of Defense who has made numerous appearances
 Popeye the Sailor once made an indirect appearance in the form of a Halloween mask worn by Zero. He made a one-time appearance in a strip dated July 16, 2012.
 2012 NCS Cartoonist of the Year Tom Richmond made an appearance in a Sunday page.
Numerous one-shot characters have appeared over the years, mostly unnamed, including an inspector general who looks like Alfred E. Neuman, and various officers and civilians. Among the few to be given names is Julian, a nondescript chauffeur eventually replaced by Julius.

Censorship

In 1962, the comic strip was censored because it showed a belly button, and in 2006, the description of Rocky's criminal past was replaced with a non-criminal past.

Self-censoring
Sometimes Mort Walker created strips with raunchy subject matter for his own amusement. This was done at the sketch stage, and those strips were never meant to be published in the U.S. They "end[ed] up in a black box in the bottom drawer", according to Walker. These sketches were sometimes published in Scandinavia, however, with a translation underneath. In Norway, they appeared in the Norwegian Beetle Bailey comic book, Billy, with the cover of the comic marked to show it contained censored strips. To offset any possible negative reaction, the publisher experimented with "scrambling" the strips in the mid-1990s. To see them, the reader had to view them through a "de-scrambling" plastic card. This was discontinued soon afterwards, and the strips later were printed without scrambling. In Sweden, some of these strips were collected in the Alfapocket series.

Animation
A television series based on the strip, consisting of 50 six-minute animated cartoon shorts produced by King Features Syndicate, was animated by Paramount Cartoon Studios in the U.S. and Artransa Film Studios in Sydney, Australia. The series was first broadcast in 1963 as part of The King Features Trilogy. 50 episodes were produced.

The opening credits included the sound of a bugle reveille, followed by a theme song specifically composed for the cartoon.
In the closing credits Geoff Pike was listed as Director. 

Beetle was voiced by comic actor and director Howard Morris with Allan Melvin as the voice of Sarge. Other King Features properties, such as Snuffy Smith and Krazy Kat, also appeared in the syndicated series, under the collective title Beetle Bailey and His Friends. June Foray did the voice of Bunny, plus all of the female characters involved.

Beetle and Sgt. Snorkel were featured prominently in the animated television film Popeye Meets the Man Who Hated Laughter, which debuted on October 7, 1972 as an episode of The ABC Saturday Superstar Movie. In the beginning of the show, General Halftrack, and Lt. Flap also appeared in the Chinese Restaurant scene.

1989 special
A 30-minute animated TV special co-written by Mort Walker and Hank Saroyan was produced for CBS in 1989, but did not air due to management changes at the CBS network. It has been released on DVD alongside the 1960s cartoons. Greg Whalen played Beetle, Bob Bergen portrayed Killer, Henry Corden was Sgt. Snorkel, Frank Welker was both Zero and Otto, Linda Gary voiced both Miss Buxley and Ms. Blips and General Halftrack was Larry Storch. This special was one of a number of specials made in the same timeframe by King Features/Hearst for TV as potential series pilots; others included Blondie & Dagwood (co-produced with Marvel Productions, who had also collaborated with King Features for the Defenders of the Earth series a few years before) and Hägar the Horrible (co-produced with Hanna-Barbera Productions).

Musical theatre
In 1988, a musical based on the comic strip premiered at Candlewood Playhouse in New Fairfield, Connecticut for a limited run. Music and lyrics were by Neil and Gretchen Gould. In addition to the familiar characters from the strip, the plot introduced a wayward computer that promoted Bailey to three-star general.

Licensing
 Over the years, Beetle Bailey characters have been licensed for dolls, T-shirts, salt and pepper shakers, toys, telephones, music boxes, handpuppets, coffee mugs, cookie jars, neckties, lunchboxes, paperback books, games, bobblehead nodders, banks, lapel pins and greeting cards. The Multiple Plastics Corporation manufactured a 1964 Camp Swampy playset, a tie-in with the cartoon TV show, with character figures accompanying the usual MPC toy GIs and military vehicles.
 In 2000, Dark Horse Comics issued two collectible figures of Beetle and Sarge as part of their line of Classic Comic Characters—statues No. 11 and 12, respectively. In honor of the strip's 50th anniversary, DHC also produced a boxed PVC figure set of seven Beetle Bailey characters (Beetle, Sarge, Gen. Halftrack, Miss Buxley, Otto, Lt. Flap and Cookie).
 BCI Eclipse has released 20 episodes of Beetle Bailey as part of Animated All Stars, a 2-DVD set (BCI 46952). Rhino Home Video also released a DVD containing 10 episodes, along with a couple of Hägar the Horrible and Betty Boop cartoons. In 2007, Beetle Bailey: The Complete Collection was released to DVD, containing all 50 shorts grouped randomly into 13 episodes, plus a previously unaired 1989 TV special.
 For Beetle Baileys 50th anniversary in 2000, Gate offered a 1/18th Willys MB with figurines of Beetle, Sarge and Otto. The figures were the same scale as the Jeep and were molded in seated poses, so they could be placed in the seats of the model. The Jeep could also be ordered without the figures, with figurines of Laurel and Hardy, or figurines of Laurel and Hardy in sailor suits.
 In 2010, fashion designer Dr. X and Bloomingdale's unveiled a limited edition retro/punk rock style line of clothing including T-shirts, leather jackets, Beetle-themed Chuck Taylors shoes and various accessories.
 In 2012, Rolex and Bamford Watch Department created a Beetle Bailey Rolex watch.

Further reading
(All titles by Mort Walker. Published by Ace Tempo/Grosset & Dunlap, unless otherwise noted. Year of publication is often based on King Features Syndicate copyright dates for lack of a book date. Book numbers for mass-market paperbacks (from the cover of the earliest available copy) are given before year of publication, for chronological purposes.

 Beetle Bailey and Sarge (1958) Dell (trade PB; illustrations, reprinted 1954-58 strips)
 Beetle Bailey: A Strip Book (1966) Saalfield Books
 Beetle Bailey (No. 1) (T-884, 1968)
 Fall Out Laughing, Beetle Bailey (No. 2) (5305, 1969)
 At Ease, Beetle Bailey (No. 3) (5329, 1970)
 I Don't Want to Be Out Here Any More Than You Do, Beetle Bailey (No. 4) (5348, 1970)
 What Is It Now, Beetle Bailey (No. 5) (5377, 1971)
 Beetle Bailey on Parade (No. 6) (5416, 1972)
 We're All in the Same Boat, Beetle Bailey (No. 7) (5561, 1973)
 I'll Throw the Book at You, Beetle Bailey (No. 8) (5582, 1973)
 Shape Up or Ship Out, Beetle Bailey (No. 9) (5708, 1974)
 Backstage at the Strips (1975) Mason/Charter
 Take Ten, Beetle Bailey (No. 10) (1975) (see also unnumbered 1989 Jove edition)
 I've Got You on My List, Beetle Bailey (12104, No. 11) (1975)
 Take a Walk, Beetle Bailey (No. 12) (12603, 1976)
 I Thought You Had the Compass, Beetle Bailey (No. 13) (12605, 1976)
 Is That All, Beetle Bailey (No. 14) (12613, 1976)
 About Face, Beetle Bailey (No. 15) (12618, 1976)
 I'll Flip You for It, Beetle Bailey (No. 16) (0-448-14037-3, 1977) ($.95 copy)
 I'll Flip You for It, Beetle Bailey (16861, 1977) (1.75 copy)
 I Just Want to Talk to You, Beetle Bailey (No. 17) (14142, 1977)
 Lookin' Good, Beetle Bailey (No. 18) (14143, 1977)
 I Don't Want to Hear About it, Beetle Bailey (0-141-05305-X, 1977) (distributed by Ace)
 Give Us a Smile, Beetle Bailey (No. 19) (17029-9, 1979)
 Peace, Beetle Bailey (No. 20) (1979; 0-441-05248-7 for 1984 Charter edition))
 Don't Make Me Laugh, Beetle Bailey (No. 21) (16977-0, 1979)
 Up, Up and Away, Beetle Bailey (17203-8, 1980)
 You're Out of Hup, Beetle Bailey (No. 22) (17332-8, 1980)
 Who's in Charge Here, Beetle Bailey (No. 23) (16932-0, 1980)
 Is This Another Complaint, Beetle Bailey (No. 24) (0-448-13777-1, 1981)
 Would It Help to Say I'm Sorry, Beetle Bailey (No. 25) (0-441-91840-9, 1981)
 Beetle Bailey: You Crack Me Up (US 50846-7, 1981) Tor
 Beetle Bailey: Flying High (49-003-8, 1981) Tor
 Otto (16839-1, 1982)
 Miss Buxley: Sexism in Beetle Bailey? (1982) Comicana
 Beetle Bailey: Activity Game Challenge (0-448-15530-3, 1982)
 Beetle Bailey: Potato Fancakes! (Pinnacle 41-338-6, 1980-84?) Tor
 Beetle Bailey: In the Soup (1980-84?) Tor
 Beetle Bailey: Dog-Gone (1980-84?) Tor
 Beetle Bailey: Not Reverse! (49-001-1, 1980-84?) Tor
 Beetle Bailey: Flying High Giant Size (49-003-8, 1981) Tor
 Beetle Bailey: Hey There! (1982) Tor
 Beetle Bailey Joke Book (1982) Tor
 Beetle Bailey: The Rough Riders (1982) Tor
 Beetle Bailey: General Alert (1982) Tor
 Beetle Bailey: Rise and Shine (49-051-8, 1983) Tor, $1.75
 Beetle Bailey: Rise and Shine Giant Size (still 49-051-8, 1983) Tor, $2.50 (includes strips from another book, possibly Play to Win)
 Beetle Bailey: Double Trouble (1983) Tor
 Beetle Bailey: Take Ten (US 56-092-2, 1984) Tor
 Beetle Bailey: Surprise Package (US 56105-8, 1984) Tor
 Beetle Bailey: Tough Luck Giant Size (US 56098-11984)
 Beetle Bailey: Operation Good Times (No. 26) (0-441-05250-9, 1984) Charter
 You'll Get a Bang Out of This, Beetle Bailey (No. 27) (0-441-05254-1, 1984) Charter
 Beetle Bailey in "Friends" (1984) Dargaud
 Beetle Bailey in Too Many Sergeants (1984) Dargaud
 Beetle Bailey in The System (1984) Dargaud
 The Best of Beetle Bailey (1984, 2005) HRW
 The Best of Beetle Bailey: A Thirty-Three Year Treasury (1984, 2007) Comicana
 Beetle Bailey: Strategic Withdrawal Giant Size (US 56105-8, 1985) Tor
 Beetle Bailey: Thin Air Giant Size (56109-0, 1985) Tor
 You're All Washed Up, Beetle Bailey (No. 28) (0-441-05298-3, 1985) Charter
 Beetle Bailey: Hard Knocks (No. 29) (0-441-05260-61985)
 Beetle Bailey: Three's a Crowd Giant Size (US 56112-1, 1986) Tor
 Beetle Bailey: Revenge (1986) Tor
 Beetle Bailey: Uncle Sam Wants You (US 56115-5, 1986) Tor
 Big Hits from Beetle Bailey (No. 30) (0-441-05263-0, 1986) Charter
 Did You Fix the Brakes, Beetle Bailey (No. 31) (1986) Jove
 Beetle Bailey: Life's a Beach! (US 56117-1, 1987) Tor
 Beetle Bailey: Undercover Operation (US 56119-8, 1987)
 What's the Joke, Beetle Bailey (No. 32) (0-441-05279-7, 1987) Charter
 Let's Change Places, Beetle Bailey (No. 33) (0-515-09088-3, 1987) Jove
 Beetle Bailey: That Sinking Feeling (US 56124-4, 1988) Tor
 Beetle Bailey: Behind the Eight Ball Again! (No. 34) (0-515--09529-X, 1988) Jove
 Beetle Bailey: Quit Hangin' Around! (No. 35) (0-515-09890-8, 1988) Tor
 Beetle Bailey: Welcome to Camp Swampy! (US 56126-0, 1989)
 Beetle Bailey: Separate Checks (US 56128-7, 1989) Tor
 Beetle Bailey: Quit Clowning Around (US 56130-9, 1989) Tor
 Beetle Bailey: Wiped Out! (No. 36) (0-515-10040-4, 1989) Jove
 Beetle Bailey: World's Laziest Private (No. 37) (0-515-10134-6, 1989) Jove
 Beetle Bailey: Celebration (1989) Andrews McMeel
 Beetle Bailey: Beetle Mania! (1990) Tor
 Beetle Bailey: A Flying Beetle? (1990) Tor
 Beetle Bailey: Advanced Planning (US 50868-8, 1990)
 Beetle Bailey: Sarge Is a Dope! (1990) Tor
 Beetle Bailey: Basket Case (No. 38) (0-5-10219-9, 1990) Jove
 Beetle Bailey: New Outfit! (No. 39) (0-515-10313-6, 1990) Jove
 Beetle Bailey: Another Request for Furlough (No. 40) (0-515-10406-X, 1990) Jove
 Beetle Bailey: Table Service (No. 41) (0-515-10499-X, 1991) Jove
 Beetle Bailey: Let's Grab a Bite! (No. 42) (0-515-10575-9, 1991) Jove
 Beetle Bailey: Wha' Happen? (No. 43) (0-515-10673-9, 1991) Jove
 Beetle Bailey: Beetle Bugged (No. 44) (0-515-10759-X, 1992) Jove
 Beetle Bailey: Corporal Punishment (No. 45) (1992) Jove
 Beetle Bailey: Keep Peeling (No. 46) (0-515-11086-8, 1992) Jove
 Beetle Bailey: Tattle "Tail" (No. 47) (0-515-10988-6, 1992) Jove
 Beetle Bailey: Dream Team (No. 48) (1993) Jove
 Beetle Bailey: Camp Swampy Strikes Again! (No. 49) (0-515-11288-7, 1993) Jove
 Beetle Bailey: Still Lazy After All These Years (1999) NBM
 50 Years of Beetle Bailey (2000) NBM
 Beetle Bailey Book and Figure Set: Sarge (2001) Dark Horse Comics
 Beetle Bailey Book and Figure Set: Beetle (2001) Dark Horse Comics
 Beetle Bailey Book and Figure Set: Miss Buxley (2001) Dark Horse Comics
 Beetle Bailey Book and Figure Set: General Halftrack (2001) Dark Horse Comics
 Mort Walker's Private Scrapbook (2001) Andrews McMeel
 Beetle Bailey, The First Years: 1950–1952 (2008) Checker
 Beetle Bailey, Daily and Sunday Strips: 1965 (2010) Titan Books

Beyond the strip
 Beetle Bailey also successfully appeared in comic books from 1953 to 1980. The first series was published by Dell Comics, then Gold Key Comics, King Comics and Charlton Comics. Harvey Comics ran a much-later second series from 1992 to 1994.
 The comic strip Hi and Lois, co-created by Mort Walker and Dik Browne, is a spin-off from Beetle Bailey (Beetle's sister is Lois Flagston). Hi and Lois, also syndicated by King Features, debuted in 1954. Characters from one strip occasionally make guest appearances in the other.
 A Beetle Bailey parody in Mad from the late 1960s portrays Sarge and Captain Scabbard finally wresting the cap off Beetle's face—revealing the words "Get Out of Viet Nam!" tattooed on his forehead.
 Beetle appeared again in Mad, this time in a Mort Drucker spoof of Conquest of the Planet of the Apes. Beetle is seen as a soldier alongside Killer attempting to quash the ape rebellion, with Killer commenting "When we trained for gorilla warfare, I never dreamed we would actually need to use it!"
 Beetle again appeared in Mad alongside Sad Sack in issue 140 in the parody of Patton retitled Put*On, where in a scene General Put*On is beating up a soldier who is shell-shocked and in the panel Beetle says to Sad Sack "Stop him! He'll tear that man's head off! Quick-get the Chief Surgeon!" which Sad Sack responds, "I've got news for you...that IS the Chief Surgeon!" Then Beetle replies, "That explains it! No WONDER he said he can't fight! Better call the Chaplain!", which Sack retorts, "I can't! He's in bed with a broken jaw! Don't you remember? HE told the General he couldn't fight, TOO!" 
 Beetle yet again appeared in a 1988 issue of Mad, alongside Sarge, in a segment explaining human anatomy according to cartoonists. Sarge's head shape was used as an example of a "sloping, subhuman skull type" which was also noted in Michael Patterson of For Better or for Worse. Beetle was featured in the section on eyes about having concealed eyes; beetlus yardbirdus, the pupil-less eyes of Little Orphan Annie; annius orphanus, and the X-ray eyes of Superman; kryptonius xrayvisionus.
 Beetle and Sarge guest-starred in the 75th anniversary party of Blondies Blondie and Dagwood in 2005.
 An animated segment featuring Beetle Bailey and his company was seen during the 1970s and 1980s on Sesame Street, demonstrating to young viewers the concept of "first" and "last".
 A life-size bronze sculpture of Beetle designed by Mort Walker with his son Neal assisting in the sculpting was unveiled at Walker's alma mater, the University of Missouri, on October 23, 1992.

See also

Explanatory notes

References

External links
 Beetle Bailey at King Features
 BeetleBailey.com
 NCS Awards
 The TV version at IMDB
 Mort Walker Collection at the University of Missouri (primary source material)

1950 comics debuts
Bailey, Beetle
American comic strips
Comics adapted into animated series
Comics adapted into plays
Comics adapted into television series
Bailey, Beetle
Bailey, Beetle
Gag-a-day comics
Bailey, Beetle
Military humor
Military comics
South Carolina in fiction